Skillinge is a locality situated in Simrishamn Municipality, in Österlen, Skåne County, Sweden with 859 inhabitants in 2010. Skillinge has become known particularly for its theatre.

Climate
Skillinge has a maritime climate with a moderated coastline and a slightly warmer interior during summers. Österlen has a drier climate than elsewhere in Southern Sweden, although it has no active weather station measuring sunshine. Even so, the cool temperatures of the Baltic Sea keeps the immediate coastline on average a couple of degrees cooler during July days than in places further north in the country. This is due to the dominance of water in the surroundings, whereas the Mälar valley around Stockholm is surrounded by more land.

Especially during summer, seasonal lag is strong on the local coastline. This means that August averages the warmest summer nights and that September is a lot warmer than May as the sea water gradually warms. During winter, this maritime proximity of Österlen reverses the climate patterns and leads to average highs above  on the coastline and frosts usually being weak even while frequent. Records for Skillinge began in 1995 and as such do not contain likely historical extremes.

References

External links 
 Official home pages 
 Home pages of Skillinge theatre 
 Harbour Pictures of Skillinge

Populated places in Skåne County
Populated places in Simrishamn Municipality